The Foundation of Technical Education (FTE) is an Iraqi administrative organization belonging to Ministry of Higher Education and Scientific Research (Iraq), it is responsible for the Iraqi Technical Colleges and Institutes.

External links
Official site
Technical Colleges in Iraq

Education in Iraq
Educational organizations based in Iraq